Guild (pronounced )  is an unincorporated community in the town of Newport in Sullivan County, New Hampshire, in the United States. It is located near the eastern boundary of Newport, along New Hampshire Routes 11 and 103. Route 11 proceeds east to Sunapee and New London, while Route 103 travels southeast to Newbury, Bradford, and Warner.  Both routes travel west to the center of Newport and on to Claremont. The village is located along the Sugar River.

Guild has a separate ZIP code (03754) from the rest of the town of Newport.

Notable people 

 Sarah Josepha Hale, author ("Mary Had a Little Lamb"); proponent of a national Thanksgiving holiday

References

Unincorporated communities in New Hampshire
Unincorporated communities in Sullivan County, New Hampshire
Newport, New Hampshire